The 410s decade ran from January 1, 410, to December 31, 419.

Significant people

References